The Lakeshore Winterhawks were a senior hockey team based out of Southampton, Ontario, Canada.  They played in the Western Ontario Athletic Association Senior Hockey League and the Northern Senior A Hockey League.  From 1967 until the mid-1980s, the team was known as the Port Elgin Sunocos from Port Elgin, Ontario and spent some of their time in the Major Intermediate A Hockey League and in for contention for the Hardy Cup.

History
The Port Elgin Sunocos began play in the Central Intermediate B Hockey League in 1967.  In the early 70s, the Sunocos were moved down to the more local Central Intermediate C Hockey League.  After dominating the local league for a few seasons, the Sunocos were moved up to the Georgian Bay Intermediate A Hockey League and into contention for the Hardy Cup.  The Hardy Cup was the Canadian grand championship of Intermediate hockey.  The Sunocos would win the 1979 GBIAHL championship, but lose the OHA title to the Georgetown Raiders.  In 1983, the Sunocos dropped from Intermediate A when their league was disbanded and into the Northern Intermediate B Hockey League with the Durham Huskies and Shelburne Muskies.  In 1985, the Sunocos went on hiatus.

In 1989, the team was reformed in Southampton as the Lakeshore Winterhawks.  The Winterhawks returned to the Sunoco's old league, known a season later as the Northern Senior A Hockey League.  The Winterhawks left the Ontario Hockey Association in 1993 when the NSAHL folded from beneath their feet.  In 1993-94, the Winterhawks found themselves in the WOAA Senior Hockey League. They played three seasons in the WOAA until 1996, when increasing departure of jobs due to the shutdown of the Bruce Nuclear Generating Station "A" caused many players to leave the area and financial difficulties, causing the team to fold.

In 2007, after eleven years without senior hockey, the Saugeen Shores Winterhawks were formed in Port Elgin.  The name pays homage to the original team.

Season-by-season record
Note: GP = Games played, W = Wins, L = Losses, T= Tie, OTL = Overtime Losses, Pts = Points, GF = Goals for, GA = Goals against

See also
Saugeen Shores Winterhawks

External links
WOAA Website
WOAASHL Website

Senior ice hockey teams
Ice hockey teams in Ontario